Tanerau Dylan Latimer (born 6 May 1986) is a New Zealand rugby union footballer who plays for the Bay of Plenty.

Career

Super Rugby
In 2011 he played his 50th match for the Chiefs and reach to his 100th match in 2014, defeated  at Waikato Stadium.

In November 2015, the Auckland  announced that they had signed Latimer on a one-year loan for the 2016 Super Rugby season.

Sevens
At the 2006 Commonwealth Games he was part of the New Zealand Sevens team that won a gold medal. He is New Zealand's youngest ever Sevens player, debuting at the age of 17 in 2004.

International
He was selected for the 2009 Iveco series after an injury to Richie McCaw sidelined him for the Series. He has played in total five tests and one non-test match for the All Blacks. In 2010 he played for the then New Zealand Maori. In 2012 he was named as the team's captain, under the new team name, Maori All Blacks.

Japan Top League
In 2014 Latimer moved to the Top League competition in Japan, where he plays for the Toshiba Brave Lupus as a flanker.

France
On 23 June 2016, Latimer made move to France to join Bayonne from the 2016–17 season.

References

External links 
 All Blacks profile
 Chiefs profile
 Bay of Plenty profile
 
 Japan Top League profile  
 Toshiba Brave Lupus profile 

1986 births
Bay of Plenty rugby union players
Chiefs (rugby union) players
Crusaders (rugby union) players
Blues (Super Rugby) players
Commonwealth Games gold medallists for New Zealand
People educated at Tauranga Boys' College
Living people
New Zealand international rugby union players
Māori All Blacks players
New Zealand rugby union players
New Zealand sportspeople of Tongan descent
People from Te Puke
Rugby sevens players at the 2006 Commonwealth Games
Rugby union flankers
New Zealand expatriate rugby union players
New Zealand expatriate sportspeople in Japan
New Zealand expatriate sportspeople in France
Expatriate rugby union players in Japan
Expatriate rugby union players in France
Toshiba Brave Lupus Tokyo players
Aviron Bayonnais players
New Zealand international rugby sevens players
Commonwealth Games rugby sevens players of New Zealand
Commonwealth Games medallists in rugby sevens
Rugby union players from the Bay of Plenty Region
Medallists at the 2006 Commonwealth Games